The Webster method, also called the Sainte-Laguë method or the major fractions method, is an apportionment method for allocating seats in a parliament among federal states, or among parties in a party-list proportional representation system. 

The method was first described in 1832 by the  American statesman and senator Daniel Webster. In 1842 the method was adopted for proportional allocation of seats in United States congressional apportionment (Act of 25 June 1842, ch 46, 5 Stat. 491). It was then replaced by Hamilton method and in 1911 the Webster method was reintroduced. The method was again replaced in 1940, this time by the Huntington–Hill method. 

The same method was independently invented in 1910 by the French mathematician André Sainte-Laguë. It seems that French and European literature was unaware of Webster until after World War II. This is the reason for the double name.

Description
After all the votes have been tallied, successive quotients are calculated for each party. The formula for the quotient is

 

where:

 V is the total number of votes that party received, and
 s is the number of seats that have been allocated so far to that party, initially 0 for all parties.

Whichever party has the highest quotient gets the next seat allocated, and their quotient is recalculated. The process is repeated until all seats have been allocated.

The Webster/Sainte-Laguë method does not ensure that a party receiving more than half the votes will win at least half the seats; nor does its modified form.

Often there is an electoral threshold; that is, in order to be allocated seats, a minimum percentage of votes must be gained.

Example
In this example, 230,000 voters decide the disposition of 8 seats among 4 parties. Since 8 seats are to be allocated, each party's total votes are divided by 1, then by 3, and 5 (and then, if necessary, by 7, 9, 11, 13, and so on by using the formula above) every time the number of votes is the biggest for the current round of calculation.

For comparison, the "True proportion" column shows the exact fractional numbers of seats due, calculated in proportion to the number of votes received. (For example, 100,000/230,000 × 8 = 3.48.)

The 8 highest entries (in the current round of calculation) are marked by asterisk: from 100,000 down to 16,000; for each, the corresponding party gets a seat. 

The below chart is an easy way to perform the calculation: 

The d'Hondt method differs by the formula to calculate the quotients ; using this formula, A would be allocated four seats and D none, reflecting the method's favoring of larger parties.

Comparison to other methods 
The method belongs to the class of highest-averages methods. It is similar to the Jefferson/D'Hondt method, but uses different divisors. The Jefferson/D'Hondt method favors larger parties while the Webster/Sainte-Laguë method doesn't. The Webster/Sainte-Laguë method is generally seen as more proportional, but risks an outcome where a party with more than half the votes can win fewer than half the seats.

When there are two parties, the Webster method is the unique divisor method which is identical to the Hamilton method.

Webster, Sainte-Laguë, and Schepers 
Webster proposed the method in the United States Congress in 1832 for proportional allocation of seats in United States congressional apportionment. In 1842 the method was adopted (Act of June 25, 1842, ch 46, 5 Stat. 491). It was then replaced by Hamilton method and in 1911 the Webster method was reintroduced.

According to some observers the method should be treated as two methods with the same result, because the Webster method is used for allocating seats based on states' population, and the Sainte-Laguë based on parties' votes. Webster invented his method for legislative apportionment (allocating legislative seats to regions based on their share of the population) rather than elections (allocating legislative seats to parties based on their share of the votes) but this makes no difference to the calculations in the method.

Webster's method is defined in terms of a quota as in the largest remainder method; in this method, the quota is called a "divisor". For a given value of the divisor, the population count for each region is divided by this divisor and then rounded to give the number of legislators to allocate to that region. In order to make the total number of legislators come out equal to the target number, the divisor is adjusted to make the sum of allocated seats after being rounded give the required total.

One way to determine the correct value of the divisor would be to start with a very large divisor, so that no seats are allocated after rounding. Then the divisor may be successively decreased until one seat, two seats, three seats and finally the total number of seats are allocated. The number of allocated seats for a given region increases from s to s + 1 exactly when the divisor equals the population of the region divided by s + 1/2, so at each step the next region to get a seat will be the one with the largest value of this quotient. That means that this successive adjustment method for implementing Webster's method allocates seats in the same order to the same regions as the Sainte-Laguë method would allocate them.

In 1980 the German physicist Hans Schepers, at the time Head of the Data Processing Group of the German Bundestag, suggested that the distribution of seats according to d'Hondt be modified to avoid putting smaller parties at a disadvantage. German media started using the term Schepers Method and later German literature usually calls it Sainte-Laguë/Schepers.

Properties 
When apportioning seats among federal states, it is particularly important to avoid bias between large states and small states. Balinsky and Young study various ways to measure this bias, both theoretically and empirically. All ways indicate that Webster's method is the least biased: for various formal definitions of bias, it is the only unbiased divisor method; this is also supported by empirical evaluation on historical US census data.

Modified Sainte-Laguë method
Some countries, e.g. Nepal, Norway and Sweden, change the quotient formula for parties that have not yet been allocated any seats (s = 0). These countries changed the quotient from V to V/1.4, though from the general 2018 elections onwards, Sweden has been using V/1.2. That is, the modified method changes the sequence of divisors used in this method from (1, 3, 5, 7, ...) to (1.4, 3, 5, 7, ...). This gives slightly greater preference to the larger parties over parties that would earn, by a small margin, a single seat if the unmodified Sainte-Laguë's method were used. With the modified method, such small parties do not get any seats; these seats are instead given to a larger party.

Norway further amends this system by utilizing a two-tier proportionality. The number of members to be returned from each of Norway's 19 constituencies (former counties) depends on the population and area of the county: each inhabitant counts one point, while each square kilometer counts 1.8 points. Furthermore, one seat from each constituency is allocated according to the national distribution of votes.

Threshold for seats 
Often a threshold or barrage is set, and any list party which does not receive at least a specified percentage of list votes will not be allocated any seats, even if it received enough votes to have otherwise receive a seat. Examples of countries using the Sainte-Laguë method with a threshold are Germany and New Zealand (5%), although the threshold does not apply if a party wins at least one electorate seat in New Zealand or three electorate seats in Germany. Sweden uses a modified Sainte-Laguë method with a 4% threshold, and a 12% threshold in individual constituencies (i.e. a political party can gain representation with a minuscule representation on the national stage, if its vote share in at least one constituency exceeded 12%). Norway has a threshold of 4% to qualify for leveling seats that are allocated according to the national distribution of votes. This means that even though a party is below the threshold of 4% nationally, they can still get seats from constituencies in which they are particularly popular.

Usage by country 
The Webster/Sainte-Laguë method is currently used in Bosnia and Herzegovina, Indonesia, Kosovo, Latvia, Nepal, New Zealand, Norway and Sweden. In Germany it is used on the federal level for the Bundestag, and on the state level for the legislatures of Baden-Württemberg, Bavaria, Bremen, Hamburg, North Rhine-Westphalia, Rhineland-Palatinate, and Schleswig-Holstein. In Denmark it is used for 40 out of the 179 seats in the Folketing, supplementing the D'Hondt method.

The Webster/Sainte-Laguë method was used in Bolivia in 1993, in Poland in 2001, and the Palestinian Legislative Council in 2006. A variant of this method, the modified Sainte-Laguë method, is used to allocate the proportional representation (PR) seats in Nepal. The 2019 Indonesian legislative election also utilized the method.

The method has been proposed by the Green Party in Ireland as a reform for use in Dáil Éireann elections, and by the United Kingdom Conservative-Liberal Democrat coalition government in 2011 as the method for calculating the distribution of seats in elections to the House of Lords, the country's upper house of parliament. The United Kingdom Electoral Commission has used the method in 2003, 2007, 2010 and 2013 to distribute British seats in the European Parliament to constituent countries of the United Kingdom and the English regions. The European Parliament (Representation) Act 2003 stipulates each region must be allocated at least 3 seats and that the ratio of electors to seats is as nearly as possible the same for each, the Commission found the Sainte-Laguë method produced the smallest standard deviation when compared to the D'Hondt method and Hare quota.

See also 
 Hagenbach-Bischoff quota

References

External links
 Excel Sainte-Laguë calculator
 Seats Calculator with the Sainte-Laguë method
 Java implementation of Webster's method at cut-the-knot
 Elections New Zealand explanation of Sainte-Laguë
 Java D'Hondt, Saint-Lague and Hare-Niemeyer calculator

Apportionment methods
Daniel Webster

fr:Scrutin proportionnel plurinominal#Méthode de Sainte-Laguë